Lizzie O'Neill (also known by the alias Honour Bright) was fatally shot in Ticknock, County Dublin, Ireland in June 1925. The case was an early test for the newly established Garda Síochána which eventually charged one of its own and a local physician with the murder. They were acquitted. A plaque stands in Ticknock marking the incident.

Before her death
Lizzie O'Neill lived in the Liberties area of Dublin and worked as a sex worker near St Stephen's Green. She worked in Pyms, a clothing shop, but lost her job when she became a single mother. Frank Duff visited a house she was staying at while doing charitable work for the Legion of Mary.

Witness statements
One of O'Neill's fellow sex workers said that a man had paid her and told her that he had been robbed of eleven pounds and a silver cigarette case earlier that evening. He was angry and said he was armed. He asked the woman's help in finding the thief and indicated that a man in a nearby car was a friend who was a superintendent in the Garda Síochána and would round up sex workers if the thief was not found. Another sex worker said she saw O'Neill and another sex worker with two men in a grey sports car outside the Shelbourne Hotel.

The last sighting of O'Neill that evening was of her getting into a car with two men at Leonard's Corner on the South Circular Road, Portobello, Dublin. She was found dead the next morning from a gunshot wound.  The car was traced to a Dr. Patrick Purcell of Blessington, County Wicklow who admitted being in Dublin on the evening in question with Garda Superintendent Leo Dillon.

Trial
The trial began on 30 January 1926. There was great interest partly due to the status of the accused. The defence argued that two witnesses, a taxi driver and a Garda constable, were lying. The jury acquitted the accused on the grounds that there was sufficient doubt.

Purcell emigrated to England due to difficulties with people in Blessington after the acquittal.

See also
List of unsolved murders
Prostitution in the Republic of Ireland

References

1925 deaths
1925 in Ireland
Deaths by firearm in the Republic of Ireland
Deaths by person in the Republic of Ireland
Female murder victims
Irish murder victims
June 1925 events
People murdered in Ireland
Unsolved murders in Ireland
1920s murders in Ireland
1925 murders in Europe
1925 crimes in Ireland
Murdered sex workers
Irish female prostitutes
Violence against women in Ireland